"Distratto" is a song recorded by Francesca Michielin, the winner of the fifth series of the Italian talent-show X Factor.
The song, written by Elisa and Roberto Casalino, was arranged and produced by Andrea Rigonat.
Michielin performed it for the first time during the semi-final of the show, on 29 December 2011. On 5 January 2012, after performing the song for a second time, Michielin was announced the winner, beating runner-up band I Moderni.

On 6 January 2012, the song was released as a digital download EP, also including three re-recorded covers previously performed during the live shows. On 12 January 2012, the single debuted at number one on the Italian Singles Chart and it was later certified double platinum by the Federation of the Italian Music Industry, for domestic downloads exceeding 60,000 units.

Composition
The song is a pop ballad with rock and soul influences. It was written from the point of view of a woman who is living the end of her relationship with a man unable to understand their problems.

Music video
The music video for the song was directed by Stefano Sollima and it features a cameo appearance by Italian actor Luca Argentero. The clip, filmed in January 2012 at the Roma Tiburtina railway station, was premiered on 3 February 2012 on Sky Uno HD.

Track listing

Chart performance

Weekly charts

Year-end charts

References

2012 debut singles
Songs written by Elisa (Italian singer)
Italian-language songs
Number-one singles in Italy
Pop ballads
Songs written by Roberto Casalino
Italian songs
X Factor (Italian TV series)
2012 songs
Sony Music singles
Francesca Michielin songs
2010s ballads